Florodora Girl may refer to:

 The Florodora Girl, a film made in 1930
 Florodora girls, a member of the chorus of the musical Florodora